is a village in Gmina Gorzyce, Wodzisław County, Silesian Voivodeship, Poland. It has a population of 1,694. The village lies on the Olza River, on the border with the Czech Republic. It is the last settlement located on the Olza River before its confluence with the Odra River.

References

External links 
  Information about village at Gmina Gorzyce website

Villages in Wodzisław County